The fourth season of King of the Hill originally aired Sundays at 7:30–8:00 p.m. (EST) on the Fox Broadcasting Company from September 26, 1999 to May 21, 2000. The Region 1 DVD was released on May 3, 2005. The Region 2 and 4 DVDs were respectively released on January 15 and June 20, 2007.

Production
The showrunners for the season were Greg Daniels and Richard Appel.

Episodes

References

1999 American television seasons
2000 American television seasons
King of the Hill 04